CEMS may refer to:

Capillary electrophoresis–mass spectrometry
Conversion electron Mössbauer spectroscopy
Continuous emissions monitoring system
CEMS – The Global Alliance in Management Education, since 1988
CEMS, Inc. v. United States, a government contracting suit
Church of England Men's Society
Rochester Area Colleges Center for Excellence in Math and Science, in Rochester, NY
Cleveland Emergency Medical Services